Balby is a civil parish and suburb of Doncaster in the City of Doncaster district in South Yorkshire, England. Historically part of the West Riding of Yorkshire, Balby is within the Doncaster Central constituency and contains the electoral wards Balby South and Hexthorpe and Balby North.

Housing stock ranging from terraced housing nearer to Doncaster town centre and post-war suburbs to the south west. There are several new housing developments, including, Woodfield Plantation which is part of an attempt to regenerate the area following deindustrialisation.

Economic activity is still centred on heavy industry, especially around the Carr Hill Industrial Estate, home to Bridon, a large rope manufacturer.

History

The earliest written reference to Balby occurs in the Domesday Book (1086), which records the name as Balle(s)bi. This almost certainly derives from a personal name, Balli, together with the Old Norse word býr (meaning a farmstead). This dates the foundation of Balby to some time in the period of Viking settlement, between the late 8th and early 11th centuries.

Balby, which then included Warmsworth, was home to several of the early followers of the Quaker faith in England, including Thomas Aldham, whose son William was instrumental in opening the first permanent meeting house in the area, in Quaker Lane, Warmsworth. Balby has long been associated, along with other areas of Doncaster, with having a large Quaker community.

More recently, the suburban town was a centre for steel and brass manufacture, especially at the well-known Pegler's Brass Foundry and Bridon Ropery. In the early 20th century, St Catherine's Hospital was built in the south of Balby, near to the site of St Catherine's Well, an ancient site of healing and pilgrimage. It is now a hospital estate.

Education
Astrea Academy Woodfields is the only secondary school in the Balby area. Balby Central Primary Academy, Carr Lodge Academy, Mallard Primary School, St Francis Xavier Catholic Primary School, Waverley Primary Academy and Woodfield Primary School are the primary schools in Balby. Sycamore Hall Preparatory School is an independent primary and there is also specialist provision at Maple Medical PRU, incorporating Hospital Tuition, the Young Parents Centre/Link/JASP and the Mulberry unit.

Amenities 
Potteric Carr Nature Reserve is a natural wetland near the Lakeside development. The site reopened in 2011 following extensive restoration by Yorkshire Wildlife Trust and charges an admission fee.

Carr Lodge Nature Reserve is a low-lying grassland, managed by Yorkshire Wildlife Trust. It is flooded in winter but dries out in summer and is used by local birdwatchers.

Future improvements
Balby is currently in the process of several redevelopment initiatives such as the construction of a new retail park and the expansion of its residential area in the form of the Woodfield Plantation, there is now a major link road from the east side of Balby to the Doncaster Lakeside and stadium areas. On this link road another new housing development, Dominion, has been built and is continuing to expand, as of 2021. A public house called the Maple Tree, a One Stop, a child's soft play area and several takeaways were built on the site to the west of the Tesco at the entrance to the Woodfield Plantation. Tesco also incorporates four units, which include a Subway, Goodnight Sleep tight, a bed shop, a charity shop and a Totally Wicked e-cig shop.

Popular culture

The external scenes for the BBC comedy Open All Hours were set and filmed on Lister Avenue, Balby. The shop (Lister Avenue at junction with Scarth Avenue) which served as Arkwright's grocery store was, and still is, a hairdresser's which was converted for the duration of filming.

See also
Listed buildings in Doncaster (Balby South Ward)
Listed buildings in Doncaster (Hexthorpe and Balby North Ward)

References

External links

 Balby Carr Community Academy website
 

Geography of Doncaster